2 Pegasi is a single star in the constellation Pegasus, located approximately 394 light years away from the Sun based on parallax. It is visible to the naked eye as a faint, red-hued star with an apparent visual magnitude of 4.52. The object is moving closer to the Earth with a heliocentric radial velocity of −19 km/s.

This is an aging red giant star with a stellar classification of M1+III, currently on the asymptotic giant branch, having exhausted the hydrogen at its core and evolved away from the main sequence. The star has expanded to an estimated 55 times the radius of the Sun.

References

M-type giants
Suspected variables
Pegasus (constellation)
BD+23 4325
Pegasi, 02
204724
106140
8225